The greenhead shiner (Notropis chlorocephalus) is a North American cyprinid fish, found in the  Catawba River system or the Santee River drainage in North Carolina and South Carolina.

References 

 Robert Jay Goldstein, Rodney W. Harper, Richard Edwards: American Aquarium Fishes. Texas A&M University Press 2000, p. 100
 

Notropis
Fish described in 1870
Taxa named by Edward Drinker Cope